John Leventhal (born December 18, 1952) is a musician, producer, songwriter, and recording engineer who has produced albums for William Bell, The Blind Boys of Alabama, Michelle Branch, Rosanne Cash, Marc Cohn, Shawn Colvin, Sarah Jarosz, Rodney Crowell, Jim Lauderdale, Joan Osborne, Loudon Wainwright III and The Wreckers. He has won six Grammy Awards.

Career
As a musician, he has worked with such artists as Jackson Browne, Willie Nelson, Bruce Hornsby, Elvis Costello, Dolly Parton, Emmylou Harris, Charlie Haden, David Crosby, Levon Helm, Edie Brickell, Paul Simon, Patty Larkin, Susan Tedeschi, the Tedeschi Trucks Band, Steve Forbert, Kelly Willis, Donald Fagen, Ry Cooder, and Johnny Cash.

As a songwriter, over 200 of his songs have been recorded by various artists, including Rosanne Cash, Shawn Colvin, Marc Cohn, Michelle Branch, The Tedeschi Trucks Band, Vince Gill, George Strait, Shelby Lynne, Patty Loveless, Jim Lauderdale, Joe Cocker and William Bell.

In 1988, he produced and co-wrote Shawn Colvin’s Grammy winning debut album Steady On. He arranged and played multiple instruments on Marc Cohn's 1991 hit "Walking in Memphis". In 1998, he won a Grammy Award for Record and Song of the Year for producing and co-writing the song "Sunny Came Home" (a 1997 hit for Colvin). Leventhal produced and co-wrote all of the songs on Rosanne Cash's 2014 release The River & the Thread. On February 8, 2015, The River & the Thread won three Grammy awards: Americana Album of the Year, Best American Roots Song for "A Feather's Not a Bird" and Best American Roots Performance for "A Feather's Not a Bird".

He produced and co-wrote most of the songs on soul singer William Bell's 2016 Stax Records release This Is Where I Live, which won the 2017 Grammy for Americana Album of the Year. In 2018 Leventhal produced the song "Let My Mother Live", co-written with Marc Cohn and performed by The Blind Boys Of Alabama; the song was nominated for a Grammy for Best American Roots Performance. The song "Crossing To Jerusalem" written with Rosanne Cash was nominated for Best American Roots song for the 2019 Grammys. Sarah Jarosz's album World on the Ground, produced by Leventhal, won the 2021 Grammy for Best Americana Album.

Leventhal has produced albums that have been nominated for a total of 19 Grammy Awards.

In September 2015, Leventhal received the Americana Music Association's award for Instrumentalist of the Year.

Leventhal also composed scores to the films Winter Solstice (2004) and Big Stone Gap (2014).

John Leventhal's songs are represented by Downtown Music Publishing.

Personal life
Leventhal lives with his wife Rosanne Cash and their children in New York City.

Leventhal's mother was of Irish and Cuban descent, and his father was Jewish. In 2014, Newsweek reported "Before [Leventhal and Cash] were married by a rabbi, Johnny Cash said, 'I've been waiting 40 years for one of my daughters to marry a Jew.'"

References

External links

1952 births
Living people
American country guitarists
American male guitarists
American rock guitarists
Record producers from New York (state)
American session musicians
Grammy Award winners
People from Scarsdale, New York
Songwriters from New York (state)
Scarsdale High School alumni
Guitarists from New York City
20th-century American guitarists
Country musicians from New York (state)
20th-century American male musicians
American people of Irish descent
American musicians of Cuban descent
American male songwriters
Cash–Carter family